Stefanie Vögele won the first edition of the tournament, defeating Marta Domachowska 6–7(3), 7–5, 6–2 in the final.

Seeds

Draw

Finals

Top half

Bottom half

References
 Main Draw
 Qualifying Draw

Aegon GB Pro-Series Bath - Singles
2011 Women's Singles